Only a Woman is a 1962 West German romantic comedy film directed by Alfred Weidenmann and starring Maria Schell, Paul Hubschmid and Hans Nielsen.

The film's sets were designed by the art director Helmut Nentwig. It was shot at the Spandau Studios and on location in Hamburg and West Berlin.

Plot
A psychiatrists love life becomes confused with that of her patients, due to her own complex issues.

Cast
 Maria Schell as Lilli König
 Paul Hubschmid as Martin Bohlen
 Hans Nielsen as Dr. Katz, Nervenarzt
 Agnes Windeck as Wanda, Housekeeper
 Anita Höfer as Pauline
 Ingrid van Bergen as Annabella
 Hannelore Auer as Gerda
 Tilly Lauenstein as Mrs. Starke
 Frank Glaubrecht as Heinz Feldmann
 Michael Hinz
 Margarete Knitsch as Lollo
 Ulli Lommel
 Friedrich Schoenfelder as Kellner
 Ingeborg Sonsalla as Gitta
 Hilde Volk as Frau Feldmann

References

Bibliography 
 Martin Blaney. Symbiosis Or Confrontation?: The Relationship Between the Film Industry and Television in the Federal Republic of Germany from 1950 to 1985. Edition Sigma, 1992.

External links 
 

1962 films
1962 romantic comedy films
German romantic comedy films
West German films
1960s German-language films
Films directed by Alfred Weidenmann
Gloria Film films
Films shot at Spandau Studios
1960s German films